Waman Thakre is an Indian photographer and a former deputy director at the Directorate of Panchayat and Social Service of the Government of Madhya Pradesh. He is a Fellow of the Royal Photographic Society and the Photographic Society of America and is a recipient of the Shikhar Award of the MP State government. The Government of India awarded him the fourth highest civilian honour of the Padma Shri, in 2007, for his contributions to Arts.

Biography 
Waman Thakre was born in a Marathi family on 24 April 1932 at Ramtek, a village in Nagpur district of the Western Indian state of Maharashtra and did his schooling at Samarth Vidyalaya, Ramtek and New Era High School, Nagpur. His college education was Chitrakala Mahavidyalaya, Nagpur and Sir Jamsetjee Jeejebhoy School of Art, Mumbai and after graduating in commercial art and photography, he started his career as an artist under state government service. He rose in ranks at government service and was a deputy director at the Directorate of Panchayat and Social Service of the Government of Madhya Pradesh at the time of his superannuation.

Thakre has conducted several exhibitions in India and abroad and holds several rare photographs in his collection; one of the photographs, a portrait of Rani Lakshmi Bai he displayed at World Photography Day exhibition at Bhopal in 2010, invited controversy as to the authenticity of the work. He is the advisor of Photolovers, an Indore-based photographic organization, and is involved with promotion of photography in the state. The Government of Madhya Pradesh awarded him Shikhar Award in 1988 and he received the fourth highest Indian civilian award of the Padma Shri in 2007.

Thakre lives in Bhopal, in Madhya Pradesh.

See also 
 Sir Jamsetjee Jeejebhoy School of Art

References

External links 
 

Recipients of the Padma Shri in arts
1932 births
People from Nagpur district
Marathi people
Photographers from Maharashtra
Living people
20th-century Indian photographers
Indian portrait photographers